Bolesław Smólski (10 May 1922 – 22 December 1979) was a Polish footballer. He played in one match for the Poland national football team in 1947.

References

External links
 

1922 births
1979 deaths
Polish footballers
Poland international footballers
Place of birth missing
Association footballers not categorized by position